LUISAVIAROMA (also known as Luisa Via Roma or LVR) is a retailer of the luxury market. Its headquarters and stores are in Florence, Italy.

History 
In 1920, Frenchwoman Luisa Jaquin opened a small hat boutique on via Roma in Florence. Her husband slowly expanded the store by adding clothes and built his own factory to produce them. While still in college, their grandson Andrea Panconesi became the visual merchandiser and flew to Paris on his first buying trip. In 1968 while in Paris, Andrea met Japanese designer Kenzō Takada and became the first store in Europe to carry his label Kenzo. From that point onwards, Andrea Panconesi has led LUISAVIAROMA. The original store in Via Roma 19/21r in Florence was renovated in 2008 using eco-conscious principles by Claudio Nardi. The design also incorporated interactive screens and a restaurant on the top floor.  Felice Limosani was Art Director of Luisa Via Roma 2002/2015 and had created and designed the multidisciplinary concept both in-store and online. The store in Via Silvio Pellico was opened in 2008.

Website 
At the beginning of the 2000s the website LUISAVIAROMA.COM was launched to give select clients the ability to shop the concept store on-line. During the first years the website was highly exclusive, but then was re-styled in 2004 and opened to all web users in English. The website was later translated into Italian, German, Chinese, Russian, French, Spanish, Japanese and Korean in an effort to expand in growing markets and adopted targeted marketing strategies. In the last few years 90% of LUISAVIAROMA's sales is from this website all over the world. All of the operational activities are developed in the headquarters in Via Varchi, Florence.

Events 
In the early 2000s,  the concept store began arranging communication events with companies such as Nokia, FIAT, Puma, Adidas, Missoni, Lacoste, Levi’s, TIM and Coca-Cola. Luisaviaroma’s starting point has always been the true belief that clients look for experiences and not only for more products.

To celebrate 10 years of on-line activity, “FIRENZE4EVER…It’s Magic!” was held for the first time. The three-day event invited 40 fashion bloggers from around the world to take part in “Style Labs” where they created multi brand looks and photo shoots. This event has since been repeated twice a year at the launch of each new fashion season from 2010 to 2017.

In August 2018 Luisaviaroma celebrated in Porto Cervo the UNICEF Summer Gala, the first charity event in collaboration with UNICEF. In November 2018 Spring Studios - a pop up store - was opened in New York. In February 2019 Naked Heart Foundation and Luisaviaroma made a collaboration in London with the charity event "Fabulous Fund Fair - Dolce Vita Night". On June 13, 2019 in Florence, Piazzale Michelangelo, Carine Roitfeld founder of CR Fashion Book and CR Studio, inaugurated the first official CR Runway fashion show: it was during this event that Luisaviaroma celebrated its 90th anniversary, by featuring 90 looks, personally curated by Carine, that paid tribute to the 1990s. Over 3,500 people were invited to view Carine Roitfeld’s favorite pieces from the Fall-Winter 2019 women’s and men’s collections: amongst the guests were J Balvin, Heron Preston, Lenny Kravitz, Virgil Abloh and others. This collection included many famous brands, with renowned models such as Gigi Hadid, Bella Hadid, Vittoria Ceretti, Mariacarla Boscono, Irina Shayk, Alessandra Ambrosio, Doutzen Kroes, Lara Stone and many others. A number of the featured looks were available on the CR Runway’s dedicated microsite.

Logistics
All orders are dispatched from the warehouse in Florence, Italy.

References

External links 
 

Retail companies of Italy
Italian brands